Oniel Theodore Cousins (born June 29, 1984) is a former American football guard and tackle. He was drafted by the Baltimore Ravens in the third round of the 2008 NFL Draft. He played college football at Texas–El Paso. He has also played for the Cleveland Browns and Tampa Bay Buccaneers.

Professional career

Baltimore Ravens
Cousins was selected by the Baltimore Ravens as a guard in the third round of the 2008 NFL Draft. During his time in Baltimore, Cousins was a backup at the position, seeing some starting time due to injuries.

On August 27, 2011, he was waived by the Ravens.

Cleveland Browns
He was claimed off waivers by the Cleveland Browns on August 29, 2011. He had one start in 2011, 0 in 2012, but was the starting right guard on opening day in 2013. He has started 4 games in the current season.

Tampa Bay Buccaneers
Cousins signed with the Tampa Bay Buccaneers on  March 16, 2014, to a one-year contract. His debut season with Tampa did not go well as he was a part of an offensive line that gave up the most sacks in the league. He became an unrestricted free agent after the 2014 season.

References

External links

Tampa Bay Buccaneers bio
Cleveland Browns bio
 UTEP Miners bio

1984 births
Living people
Jamaican players of American football
American football offensive tackles
American football offensive guards
UTEP Miners football players
Baltimore Ravens players
Cleveland Browns players
Tampa Bay Buccaneers players